Vietnamia is a genus of trilobites. A new species, V. yushanensis, was described from the late Ordovician of China by Dong-Chan Lee in 2011.

References

Calymenidae
Ordovician trilobites of Asia